The Cannock Chase Railways were mineral lines which served the collieries and many parts of Staffordshire. The branch lines and sidings branched off the local mainlines including the Grand Junction Railway, Chase Line, South Staffordshire Line and Rugby–Birmingham–Stafford line. The main junction on the railways was Norton Junction. This junction connected the lines from Walsall and Hednesford to Wolverhampton and Rugeley Trent Valley for the local collieries and the mines in the towns of Brownhills, Burntwood, Chasetown, Penkridge and Cannock.

History
Originally, the construction contract was let to Taylor R. Stephenson who was a railway contractor. His civil engineer for the project was George Heald. In 1858 Heald died of tuberculosis at Rugeley; the person who reported the death was T. R. Stephenson. Losing the engineer for the project and with the line incomplete, Thomas Brassey was engaged to complete it.

The sidings and branch lines to the quarries ran around the Cannock Chase and Staffordshire area. There was a direct link built via Huntington to Penkridge which gave the lines a direct link to the mainlines at Stafford and Stoke-on-Trent. The only lines which carried a form of passenger service was the Aldridge to Brownhills Branch and Chase Line. There was direct connections to Walsall and Dudley with a mineral branch from Ryders Hayes Crossing near Pelsall. Which also had a steelworks located west of the line.

Aside from Norton Junction, there was also important sidings on the South Staffordshire Line at the Angelsea Sidings. These closed in 1960s to Norton Canes. The Cannock Military Railway and Cannock Mineral Railway also operated around the many lines of Cannock Chase.

Present 

The lines were closed between the 1950s and early 1970s. The section from Brownhills West to Burntwood has found new use as Chasewater Railway. The branch from Pelsall to Norton Canes is now a public footpath. It has been partially blocked by the M6 Toll. The section from Cannock to Penkridge is still traceable as a walkway but has been built on at Cannock end. Three bridges remain at Penkridge End.

Norton Junction is now a large public park with all the old trackbeds with the exception of the section to Pelsall. Built on by housing estates and industrial. The section from Cannock to Brownhills is now lost under development and road alignments, but sections can still be found around Cannock as footpaths. The section from Chasewater to Aldridge has been lost under the M6 Toll and built on at Walsall Wood and Aldridge.

Archives 
Historical records of Cannock Chase and Wolverhampton Railway Company Limited (covering the period 1852-1946) are held at the Cadbury Research Library, University of Birmingham.

References

External links

Industrial railways in England